Bell frog may refer to:

 Green and golden bell frog (Litoria aurea), a frog in the family Hylidae native to eastern Australia
 Southern bell frog (Litoria raniformis), a frog in the family Hylidae native to southeastern Australia including Tasmania
 Tablelands bell frog (Litoria castanea), a frog in the family Hylidae endemic to southeastern Australia
 Western bell frog (Litoria moorei), a frog in the family Hylidae found in southwest Australia

Animal common name disambiguation pages